Puntay Urqu (Quechua) is a mountain and an archaeological site in Peru located in the Ayacucho Region, Vilcas Huamán Province, Carhuanca District. It lies between the villages Hanan Raymi (Rayme Alto) and Urpaypukyu (Urpaypuquio). The place is also visited as a viewpoint.

References

Mountains of Peru
Mountains of Ayacucho Region
Archaeological sites in Peru
Archaeological sites in Ayacucho Region